Carlisle is a home rule-class city in Nicholas County, Kentucky, United States. The population was 2,010 at the 2010 census. It is the county seat of Nicholas County. It is located at the junction of Kentucky Route 32 and Kentucky Route 36, about halfway between Lexington and Maysville.

History
Carlisle was founded in 1816 when John Kincart donated land to facilitate the relocation of the county seat from Ellisville,  to the north.

Geography

Demographics

As of the census of 2010, there were 2,010 people, 892 households, and 546 families residing in the city. The racial makeup of the city was 97.10% White, 0.8% African American, 0.3% Asian, 0.3% from other races, and 1.4% from two or more races. Hispanic or Latino of any race were 1.3% of the population.

There were 892 households, out of which 25.7% had children under the age of 18 living with them, 42.3% were married couples living together, 13.2% had a female householder with no husband present, and 38.8% were non-families. 35% of all households were made up of individuals, and 37.2% had someone living alone who was 65 years of age or older. The average household size was 2.25 and the average family size was 2.88.

In the city, the population was spread out, with 24.4% under the age of 19, 5.0% from 20 to 24, 24.3% from 25 to 44, 25.5% from 45 to 64, and 20.8% who were 65 years of age or older. The median age was 42.3 years. For every 100 females, there were 81.9 males. For every 100 females age 18 and over, there were 79.2 males.

The median income for a household in the city was $34,112, and the median income for a family was $42,664.

Education
Public Schools: 

• Nicholas County Elementary School

• Nicholas County Middle School

• Nicholas County High School

Private Schools:

• New Beginnings Christian Academy

Public Library:

Carlisle has a lending library, a branch of the Nicholas County Public Library.

Notable people
Betty Blake, Steamboat preservationist.
Daniel Boone, pioneer, folk hero
Gatewood Galbraith, political activist
Bela M. Hughes, pioneer
Robert T. McCowan, Ashland Oil Vice Chairman and UK Board Director
Barbara Kingsolver, writer
Thomas Metcalfe, moved to a farm in Carlisle

References

Cities in Kentucky
Cities in Nicholas County, Kentucky
County seats in Kentucky